The Other Woman is a 1921 American silent drama film directed by Edward Sloman and starring Jerome Patrick, Jane Novak and Helen Jerome Eddy.

Cast
 Jerome Patrick as Langdon Kirven / John Gorham
 Jane Novak as Naomi Joyce
 Helen Jerome Eddy as Avery Kirven
 William Conklin as Spencer Ellis
 Joseph J. Dowling as Colonel Joyce
 Frankie Lee as Bobbie Kirven
 Lincoln Palmer as Charles Beattle
 Kate Price as Housekeeper

References

Bibliography
 Munden, Kenneth White. The American Film Institute Catalog of Motion Pictures Produced in the United States, Part 1. University of California Press, 1997.

External links
 
 

1921 films
1921 drama films
1920s English-language films
American silent feature films
Silent American drama films
Films directed by Edward Sloman
Films distributed by W. W. Hodkinson Corporation
1920s American films